
Year 314 BC was a year of the pre-Julian Roman calendar. At the time, it was known as the Year of the Consulship of Libo and Longus (or, less frequently, year 440 Ab urbe condita). The denomination 314 BC for this year has been used since the early medieval period, when the Anno Domini calendar era became the prevalent method in Europe for naming years.

Events 
 By place 
 Macedonian Empire 
 Aristodemus of Miletus convinces the common assembly of the Aetolians to support Antigonus       
 Alexander (son of Polyperchon) is killed by Alexion of Sicyon. His wife Cratesipolis assumes power and holds the army together        
 Antigonus, the ruler of the Asian parts of the late Alexander the Great's empire, faces a coalition consisting of Cassander, the Macedonian regent; Lysimachus, the satrap of Thrace; and Ptolemy, the satrap of Egypt, who have taken the side of the ousted satrap of Babylon, Seleucus.
 Antigonus does not trust Peithon's growing power. So Antigonus tricks Peithon to come to his court, where Antigonus has him executed.
 Antigonus invades Syria, then under Ptolemy's control, and besieges and captures Tyre. Antigonus then occupies Syria, proclaiming himself regent.

 Greece 
 As Cassander fights to retain control over central Greece, Antigonus promises freedom to the Greek cities in a bid to gain support from them against Cassander. 
 The Aetolians enter into an alliance with Antigonus, and the League of the Islanders is established under Antigonus' hegemony. Cassander marches against them with his allies Lysimachus, Ptolemy and Seleucus and destroys the city of Agrinio 
 Roman Republic 
 Success seems to be going the Samnites' way in their ongoing battles against the Romans. Campania is on the verge of deserting Rome. Peace is established between Rome and some Samnite towns.

 China 
 Zhou Nan Wang becomes King of the Zhou Dynasty of China.
 The city of Guilin is founded by the Qin Dynasty.

Births

Deaths 
 Xenocrates, Greek philosopher, pupil of Plato and head of the Greek Academy (b. 396 BC)
 Aeschines, Athenian orator and politician (b. 389 BC)
 Alexander (son of Polyperchon)

References